Walter Slockie (or Slockee) (1903-1961) was an Australian indigenous rugby league footballer who played in the 1920s and 1930s.

Walter Slockie was a very talented indigenous rugby league player from Murwillumbah, New South Wales. He featured in many of the Queensland All Black teams of this period, often playing with another St. George Dragons player, Walter Mussing. He made a brief appearance in the NSWRFL competition in Sydney with the St. George Dragons for one season in 1925, but returned north to Queensland to continue his career for many more years.

References

1903 births
1961 deaths
Australian rugby league players
Date of birth missing
Date of death missing
Indigenous Australian rugby league players
Rugby league players from Tweed Heads, New South Wales
Rugby league wingers
St. George Dragons players